Mention is a social listening web application owned by NHST Media Group and headquartered in Paris, France. Mention sells an all-in-one platform offering online monitoring, analytics, and social media management.

The tool monitors several online sources, including blogs, forums, news sites, videos, images, and social networks, including Facebook, Twitter, TikTok, Pinterest, YouTube, Instagram, and Review Sites. Users can search the web and social networks by using keywords, URLs, or Boolean logic.

History
In November 2011, inside the eFounders start-up incubator in Paris, France, Arnaud Le Blanc wrote the first line of code for Mention. He worked alongside Edouard de la Joncquière to continue developing the tool until it was fully functioning. In 2012, Mention reached a milestone of collecting 1 billion mentions across the web and social networks. Mention was officially co-founded in 2013, by Arnaud Le Blanc and Edouard de la Joncquière.

Investment 
In January 2013, the company was officially established, with 50,000 users, and raised $800,000 in flash seed funding from Alven Capital and Point Nine Capital.

Expansion 
In October 2014, Matthieu Vaxelaire became the CEO of Mention and was formerly a partner at eFounders. Under his leadership, Mention was able to expand its services to offer more than a freemium solution. Vaxelaire introduced Mention’s enterprise services with full account management, suitable for Small-Medium Enterprises (SME) teams. Later in 2014, Wired Magazine named Mention as one of the hottest European startups of the year. In 2016, Mention expanded to the US market, and opened an office in New York City, to cater to the growing North American customer base. The Mention product continued to innovate between 2018 and 2019, with the introduction of Publish, offering social media content creation and post scheduling.

Mynewsdesk Acquisition 
In August 2018, Mention was acquired by Mynewsdesk, owned by NHST Media Group after reaching $5.4M  Annual Recurring Revenue (ARR).

Overview 
Mention is a solution that strives to empower businesses to maximize their digital strategy by better understanding audience conversations. Mention is a solution that helps brands, agencies, and businesses from all industries to focus on brand monitoring, competitive analysis, e-reputation, and social media management.

Today, Mention remains a competitive player in the media monitoring industry, continuing to innovate the product offering to meet the demands of digital communicators.

Features & Services

Social Listening & Instant Monitoring 
Mention allows users to create alerts compiled of keywords to monitor over 1 billion sources across the web, including press articles, review sites, forums, blogs, social media, and more.

Social Media Management 
Mention offers social media management with Publish and Respond features, allowing users to create, schedule, and post directly to social profiles, or respond to and keep track of direct messages.

Reporting & Analytics 
Mention provides a reporting feature where users can create, automate and share reports. Reports can be created for specific needs, based on social networks, comparative, or a list of mentions collected.

Data Visualization 
Mention’s Insights Center is where data can be explored by reach, sentiment, gender, location, and trending topic.

Account Management 
Mention is a collaborative tool where the number of users is unlimited and the alerts can be shared.

Pricing

Self-Service Subscriptions 
Mention offers plans to suit all types of businesses. Pricing for Mention’s monthly subscription starts at $29.99 per month.

Company Subscription 
The company subscription is a customized plan with a dedicated Account Manager. Select add-on features for this plan include Advanced Alerts, historical data, and additional mentions quota.

References

External links

Social media companies